''Not affiliated with St. Jude Children's Research Hospital in Memphis, Tennessee; which is the Hospital most people are referring to when they mention "St.Jude Children's Research Hospital." 

St. Jude Medical Center is a faith-based, not-for-profit hospital, located in Fullerton, California, which was established by the Sisters of St. Joseph of Orange in 1957.

Part of the St. Joseph Health System, St. Jude Medical Center serves as a quaternary and referral center for a variety of patient services, including one of California's only accredited programs in spinal cord injury, brain injury, and comprehensive stroke rehabilitation.  Other areas of specialty include: high- and low-risk maternity, digestive diseases and GI surgery, orthopedics and joint replacement, neurosciences, women's health, rehabilitation, cardiac care, robotic and minimally-invasive surgery, and cancer care. 

In 2014, the hospital opened the $255 million Northwest Tower, which along with the Southwest Tower built several years earlier, created private patient rooms. Key areas of expansion included three entire floors dedicated to maternity services and another floor encompassing 14 "smart" surgical suites, including a "hybrid" cardiovascular suite with robotic c-arm imaging, and a dedicated neurosurgery suite with intraoperative MRI. Additional surgical technology includes da Vinci surgical robots as well as the superDimension robotic system for lung cancer treatment.

Specialty Centers of Care
 The Virginia K. Crosson Cancer Institute
 Ann G. Fetters Diagnostic Imaging Center
 The St. Jude Centers for Rehabilitation and Wellness 
 The Kathryn T. McCarty Breast Center
 Fred A. Jordan Radiation Oncology Center
 The St. Jude Neurosciences Institute
 Center for Thoracic and Esophageal Diseases 
 The St. Jude Knott Family Endoscopy Center
 Orthopedics and Sports Medicine
 Cardiac Services
 Sleep Center
 Chronic Pain Program
 Synergy Medical Fitness Center
 St. Jude Advanced Wound Care and Hyperbaric Medicine
 Maternity Services, including Fetal Diagnostic Center and Neonatal Intensive Care Unit
 Minimally-invasive and robotic surgery
 Women's health, including advanced gynecological care

Affiliations
St. Jude Medical Center is one of three St. Joseph Health hospitals in Orange County – each founded by the Sisters of St. Joseph of Orange—part of a 14-hospital system within the western United States that includes outpatient services, fetal diagnostic center, as well as inpatient services. In 2014, a partnership with Hoag Hospital created an integrated health system called St. Joseph Hoag Health.

History

The Sisters of St. Joseph of Carondelet began operating their first hospital in Eureka, California in 1919 in response to the Spanish Flu epidemic. The Order moved its mother house to Orange County in 1922. They acquired Fullerton General Hospital, a historic facility designed by Frederick Eley, in 1931, but it did not meet postwar standards for operation. The Sisters began raising the one million dollars estimated as necessary to build a new hospital.

In 1953 a group of physicians, led by Ramiro Fernandez, M.D., met with the sisters to see about building a new hospital. It was Dr. Fernandez's wife, Emily, who suggested the name St. Jude, the patron saint of desperate situations. 

A businessman, Miles Sharkey, donated land in western Fullerton with the stipulation that it be used to build a hospital.  Of the  acquired by the Sisters, the first  was deeded to them for $10. On November 24, 1953, the hilltop property on which St. Jude Hospital was later built was blessed and dedicated.

St. Jude's Hospital was publicly dedicated on May 11, 1957, with 2000 spectators in attendance as well as dignitaries including Congressman James B. Utt and Cardinal James McIntyre, Archbishop of Los Angeles.

References

External links
St. Jude Medical Center Historical Timeline
This hospital in the CA Healthcare Atlas A project by OSHPD

Catholic hospitals in North America
Hospitals in Orange County, California
Buildings and structures in Fullerton, California
Roman Catholic Diocese of Orange
Hospital buildings completed in 1957